The 2013 Hampton Pirates football team represented Hampton University in the 2013 NCAA Division I FCS football season. They were led by fifth year head coach Donovan Rose and played their home games at Armstrong Stadium. They were a member of the Mid-Eastern Athletic Conference.

The Pirates entered the season with a new offensive and defensive coordinator. Earlier in the off-season Glen Ferebee was brought on board to be the Quarterbacks coach at Hampton. However, on July 2, he was named as the new offensive coordinator. Meanwhile, Bernard Clark Jr. was brought back to be the Pirates defensive coordinator. Previously Clark served as defensive coordinator for Hampton under Rose in 2009.

At the MEAC Media Days on July 26, Hampton was picked to finish 6th in the 2013 MEAC season. Hampton also entered the season with one defensive player and two special teams players having been selected for 2nd team All-Conference.

They finished the season 4–8, 4–4 in MEAC play to finish in a three-way tie for fifth place.

At the end of the season, head coach Donovan Rose was fired after 5 seasons.

Schedule

Source: Hampton University Announces 2013 football schedule

References

Hampton
Hampton Pirates football seasons
Hampton Pirates football